The Men's 800 metres event  at the 2005 European Athletics Indoor Championships was held on March 4–5.

Medalists

Results

Heats
The winner of each heat (Q) and the next 3 fastest (q) qualified for the final.

Final

References
Results

800 metres at the European Athletics Indoor Championships
800